"World Enough and Time" is the eleventh and penultimate episode of the tenth series of the British science fiction television series Doctor Who. It was written by Steven Moffat, directed by Rachel Talalay, and was broadcast on 24 June 2017 on BBC One. The episode received overwhelmingly positive reviews from television critics.

In the episode, the Doctor (Peter Capaldi), Bill (Pearl Mackie), Nardole (Matt Lucas), and Missy (Michelle Gomez) answer a distress call from a gigantic ship trying to escape a black hole. It is the first episode of a two-part story which concludes in the following episode, "The Doctor Falls". "World Enough and Time" is the first multi-Master episode in the show's televised history, as it features both Missy, the character's latest incarnation, and an earlier version (John Simm) last seen in the 2009–2010 serial "The End of Time". It also serves as an origin story for the Cybermen, and features the return of the original Mondasian Cybermen, last seen on-screen in the 1966 serial The Tenth Planet, which was the Cybermen's debut.

Synopsis
In the cold open, the Twelfth Doctor emerges from the TARDIS onto a snowscape and collapses, beginning to regenerate.

Earlier, the Doctor proposed to test Missy's atonement by having her, alongside Bill and Nardole, answer a distress call. They arrive via the TARDIS on a giant colony ship reversing away from a black hole. They are held at gunpoint by the solitary crew member, Jorj, who demands to know which of them is human, fearing creatures that are arriving by the lift. Bill admits to being human and Jorj shoots her out of fear. Humanoid figures, wearing cloth masks and hospital gowns, take Bill's body away claiming they can restore her. Right before the lifts depart, the Doctor telepathically tells Bill to wait for him.

The Doctor, Missy, and Nardole learn from Jorj that, two days previously, some of the human bridge crew had gone down to the lower level of the ship to start the engine reversal, but they never returned. Jorj claims the ship only had 50 people two days ago, but Nardole shows there are actually thousands of life forms below. They are the descendants of the crew: due to time dilation from the black hole, time moves faster at the ship's lower levels (further from the black hole) than the bridge (close to the black hole) 400 miles away, and a year  has already passed for Bill. The Doctor incapacitates Jorj and, along with Missy and Nardole, departs below in a lift.

Bill awakens in a hospital, where she finds that she has been fitted with a mechanical device that serves as her replacement heart. Razor, one of the hospital's employees, shows her around and explains that some of the patients are waiting to be "upgraded" for "Operation Exodus", to escape the polluted air of the ship's lower levels due to contamination from the fuel. Years later, they see footage from the bridge of the Doctor coming down the lift. However, Razor then tricks Bill into becoming the next "upgrade" subject.

Upon arriving, the Doctor and Nardole explore the hospital while Missy tries to determine the origin of the colony ship. She finds the vessel is from a "twin" of Earth, Mondas. Razor approaches her and insists she has been here before, and that the Doctor will never forgive her for what has happened to Bill. When she denies it, "Razor" removes his disguise, revealing himself to be the Master (as played by John Simm), Missy's earlier incarnation. The Doctor and Nardole find an operating theatre where a "Mondasian" Cyberman, from when the Doctor first encountered them, emerges from a closet. The Cyberman identifies itself as formerly being Bill Potts. The Master and Missy then explain they are all witnessing the genesis of the Cybermen. The Cyberman tells the Doctor "I waited for you", revealing that Bill is the Cyberman; underneath its face cover, Bill sheds a tear.

Continuity
Bill is converted into a Cyberman matching the original design from the 1966 serial The Tenth Planet.

The Doctor performs Venusian aikido on Jorj, a specialty of the Third Doctor that he first demonstrated in The Green Death (originally called "Venusian karate" in Inferno).

The Master says that he loves disguises, a fondness which dates back to his debut appearance in Terror of the Autons when he posed as a telephone engineer. He also mentions being "someone's former Prime Minister"; the Master was elected Prime Minister during "The Sound of Drums" / "Last of the Time Lords", under the alias Harold Saxon.

Outside references
The episode's title comes from the Andrew Marvell poem "To His Coy Mistress": "Had we but world enough and time, / This coyness, lady, were no crime."

Production 
The read-through for this episode took place on 21 February 2017, and the main shooting was from 24 February through 28 March.

On 6 March 2017, it was announced the original Mondasian Cybermen from The Tenth Planet would be returning for the finale of the tenth series.

Casting
On 6 April 2017, the BBC confirmed that Simm would be returning as the Master in the tenth series, appearing alongside his successor in the role, Michelle Gomez, for the first story in the programme's history with more than one incarnation of the Master at the same time.

Broadcast and reception
The episode was watched by 3.37 million viewers overnight, one of the lowest ratings for the series. Compared to other programmes that aired on the same night, Doctor Who had an audience share of 22%. The episode received 5.00 million views overall, and it received an Appreciation Index of 85, the joint highest score of Twelfth Doctor episodes along with "Dark Water" from the eighth series.

Critical reception 

"World Enough and Time" received overwhelmingly positive reviews from television critics, with many of them hailing it the best episode of the tenth series, but also criticizing the BBC for spoiling the cliffhanger early on. The episode holds an approval rating of 100% on Rotten Tomatoes, the website's consensus reading, "'World Enough and Time' sets up the conclusion of Doctor Whos tenth season with a cliffhanger episode that deftly blends many of the show's most important ingredients."

Bradley Russell from SFX Magazine gave the episode a rating of 4 stars out of 5. Stating that the episode was about "playing with expectation", he stated that the episode was the regular mix of science-fiction scares and horror, but that everything felt very slightly out of place. He did, however, compliment the ending of the episode and how it gave more ample motivation to watch the finale episode. He stated that the opening scene of the regeneration was a "cheap tactic" with no answers given, but the idea of Missy filling the Doctor's shoes was far more interesting. He also stated that some scenes were "bordering on unwatchable for young children" and "too slow and filled with exposition".

Scott Collura of IGN gave the episode a 9.0, admiring the character development of Missy through the episode, as she is finally depicted as "out and about as the Mistress", and how Steven Moffat does a good job of deconstructing the name and meaning of the show. He went on to praise "World Enough and Time" as a great buildup for the season finale, noting that "like the Master and Missy themselves, this episode is sort of a two-faced monster – but a good one that seems to be bringing the tenth season to a strong finish". He stated that the episode was full of great science-fiction concepts, high stakes for all of the main and supporting characters, and how the episode was full of "humor, scares, and more".

Ross Ruediger of New York magazine was also extremely positive about the episode, praising Steven Moffat's writing and the script's cleverness, but also indicating that it was easy to see through the disguise of John Simm since the appearance of the Master had been spoiled early on: "Who'd have guessed Simm was returning after all these years? Imagine how much more powerful that reveal could've been!" He stated that the episode aimed to grab the viewer's attention even before the credits, with the regeneration scene, stating that it was a far better "regeneration" than the one that had previously appeared in "The Lie of the Land". He also complimented Rachel Talalay's direction of the episode, after having a track record with Peter Capaldi's series finales.

Giving the episode a perfect score, Patrick Mulkern of Radio Times called it "macabre and riveting", stating that the conversion of Bill Potts into the Mondasian Cyberman and the revelation at the end of the episode "packed more punch" than Jackie Tyler's Cyber-conversion in the second series or Oswin Oswald being revealed as a Dalek in the "Asylum of the Daleks". Mulkern ended his review with praise towards the cliffhanger ending: "The close of World Enough and Time is sublime. Steven Moffat’s script deftly cuts between two scenes of revelation, expertly shot by director Rachel Talalay."

References

External links

 
 
 

Twelfth Doctor episodes
2017 British television episodes
Television episodes written by Steven Moffat
The Master (Doctor Who) television stories
Cybermen television stories
Fiction about black holes
Doctor Who multi-Master stories
Television episodes set in hospitals
Television episodes set in outer space